Agder Police District (Norwegian: Agder politidistrikt) covers the county of Agder except Sirdal municipality in Norway, approximately .  The district is headquartered in Kristiansand and consists of five police stations, Kristiansand and in Flekkefjord, Mandal, Grimstad and Arendal, and thirteen sheriff's offices (lensmannskontor). Stays and immigration cases are processed at the headquarters in Kristiansand. In the police district are approximately 280,000 inhabitants.  Agder Police District was established on 1 January 2002 by a merger of the former police districts of Vest-Agder, Kristiansand and Arendal.

The easiest way to contact the police in Agder is by telephone, emergency ☎ 112, non-emergency
calls at ☎ 02800 or ☎ (+47) 38 13 60 00.

History: in 2022, the police district apologized in regard to the mistakes made during the investigation of Baneheia murders; the murders were in 2000.

See also 
Norwegian Police Service

References

Police districts in Norway
Organisations based in Kristiansand